Den vassa eggen is the ninth studio album by Swedish rock artist Ulf Lundell and was released on October 21, 1985, through Pandion. It was produced by Lasse Lindbom, Lundell and Kjell Andersson. The album has sold platinum in Sweden.

Track listing
Släpp mej fri
Chans
Den vassa eggen
Kyssar och smek
Nytt liv
Äktenskap
Inte ett ont ord
En fri man i stan
Lit de parade
En ängel på isen
Aldrig så ensam
Tuff match (alternativ version)
Främmande stad
Vi kunde ha älskat
Rialto

Personnel
 Ulf Lundell - vocals, guitar, harmonica
 Janne Bark - guitar, banjo
 Backa Hans Eriksson - bass, OSCar, timpani, marimba, String arrangements
 Hasse Olsson - Yamaha DX7, Juno 60, Roland JX-3P, Hammond-orgel, marimba
 Pelle Sirén - guitar
 Niklas Strömstedt - piano, Yamaha DX7, Korg DW-6000, Roland JX-3P, Juno 106
 Tim Werner - drums, percussion
 Pelle Andersson - percussion
 Mats Sjöström - bag pipes
 Lasse Lindbom - guitar
 Janne Kling - flute

Choir
 Janne Bark, Backa Hans Eriksson, Tove Naess, Niklas Strömstedt, Lasse Lindbom, Marianne Flynner, Marie Fredriksson

Violin
Anders Dahl, Aleksander Migdal, Lennart Fredriksson, Lars Stegenberg, Gunnar Eklund, Gunnar Michols, Lars Arvinder, Bo Söderström, Bertil Orsin, Olle Markström, Harry Teike

Cello
Daniel Holst, Peter Molander, Gunnar Östling, Åke Olofsson, Sebastian Öberg

Charts

References

1985 albums
Ulf Lundell albums
Swedish-language albums